The Boundary Range, formerly known as the Boundary Mountains, is a subrange of the similarly named but much larger Boundary Ranges which run most of the length of the border between British Columbia, Canada, and Alaska, United States.  The range lies west of the lower Stikine River between the Mud (S) and Flood Glaciers (N).

See also
Stikine, British Columbia ( "Boundary")
Coast Mountains
Stikine Icecap

References
 
  (rescinded May 6, 1954)
 Boundary Range in the Canadian Mountain Encyclopedia

Boundary Ranges
Mountains of Wrangell, Alaska
Stikine Country